Code page 1127 (CCSID 1127), also known as Arabic / French PC Data, is used by IBM in its PC DOS operating system.

Codepage layout 

� Not in Unicode

References

1127